Diodora aguayoi is a species of sea snail, a marine gastropod mollusk in the family Fissurellidae, the keyhole limpets.

Description

The size of the shell reaches 22 mm.

Distribution
This species occurs in the Gulf of Mexico, the Caribbean Sea and off Bermuda and Barbados.

References

 Rosenberg, G., F. Moretzsohn, and E. F. García. 2009. Gastropoda (Mollusca) of the Gulf of Mexico, Pp. 579–699 in Felder, D.L. and D.K. Camp (eds.), Gulf of Mexico–Origins, Waters, and Biota. Biodiversity. Texas A&M Press, College Station, Texas.
 Turgeon, D.D., et al. 1998. Common and scientific names of aquatic invertebrates of the United States and Canada. American Fisheries Society Special Publication 26 page(s): 57

External links
 

Fissurellidae
Gastropods described in 1943